The Harry A. Johnson Trapline Cabin is a log cabin in a remote location on the Kenai Peninsula of south-central Alaska. The cabin was built in 1926 by Harry A. Johnson, a semi-recluse who came to Alaska in 1904 to work on the railroads, and lived a life of subsistence and occasional work. Johnson built the cabin in part as a place where he could engage in nature photography, particularly of wildlife.

The cabin was listed on the National Register of Historic Places in 2000.

See also
National Register of Historic Places listings in Kenai Peninsula Borough, Alaska

References

1926 establishments in Alaska
Houses completed in 1926
Houses in Kenai Peninsula Borough, Alaska
Houses on the National Register of Historic Places in Alaska
Log cabins in the United States
Buildings and structures on the National Register of Historic Places in Kenai Peninsula Borough, Alaska
Log buildings and structures on the National Register of Historic Places in Alaska